Keystone Bop Vol. 2: Friday & Saturday is a live album by jazz musicians Freddie Hubbard, Joe Henderson & Bobby Hutcherson recorded in November 1981 and released on the Prestige label in 1996. The Allmusic review by Rick Anderson states "if you're expecting tight, hard-driving conventional bop, you'll be disappointed. These renditions average out to over 17 minutes each, with all the discursive extravagance that treatment implies. But that's not all bad, by any means... But it's hard not to think that offering more, briefer tunes wouldn't have made these performances a bit more interesting and fun overall. Still, fans won't be disappointed".

Track listing
All compositions by Freddie Hubbard except as indicated
 "One of Another Kind" – 17:30  
 "'Round Midnight" (Thelonious Monk) – 12:16  
 "Red Clay" – 19:45  
 "First Light" – 20:04  
Recorded at Keystone Korner, San Francisco, California on November 27 & 28, 1981

Personnel
Freddie Hubbard - trumpet
Joe Henderson - tenor saxophone
Bobby Hutcherson - vibes
Billy Childs - piano
Larry Klein - bass
Steve Houghton - drums

References

Bobby Hutcherson live albums
Joe Henderson live albums
1996 live albums
Freddie Hubbard live albums
Prestige Records live albums
Albums recorded at Keystone Korner